Peter Gottfried Kremsner (born 16 May 1961 in Wiener Neustadt, Austria) is a specialist in tropical medicine and Full Professor at the University of Tübingen, Germany. Since 1992 he has been leading the Centre de Recherches Médicales de Lambaréné (CERMEL), Gabon, now as president.

Biography
Kremsner grew up in Sigleß, Austria. He studied medicine at the University of Vienna, graduating in 1985 as Doctor of Medicine. He started his academic career as a medical researcher at the Institute of Specific Prophylaxis and Tropical Medicine, University of Vienna. 1987 he went to Brazil working there for the Superintendencia de Campanhas de Saude Publica at Rio Branco. From 1988 to 1996 he held the position of a group leader at the Institute of Tropical Medicine in Berlin. 1990 he earned his habilitation for Tropical Medicine and Specific Prophylaxis at the University of Vienna and 1992 an additional habilitation for Tropical Medicine and Parasitology at the Humboldt University of Berlin. 
1992 he started the medical research center in Lambaréné, now Centre de Recherches Médicales de Lambaréné (CERMEL), and made it one of the premier research and training centers in Africa. 1996 Kremsner was appointed Professor for Parasitology at the University of Tübingen. Since 2008 he has been Chairman and Professor for Tropical Medicine, Travel Medicine and Parasitology at Tübingen University as well as Director of the Institute for Tropical Medicine. In 2014 he was additionally appointed CEO of the Comprehensive Infectious Disease Center of University Hospital Tübingen. 2016 he became also Adjunct Professor at the Medical University of Vienna.

Research
Kremsner led numerous studies on tropical infectious diseases and is author of more than 700 scientific publications. Since the 1990s he is the most cited scientist in the field of parasitology in Germany  and currently the most cited scientist in the fields of parasitology, tropical medicine and travel medicine in Europe (EU). He has been principal investigator on key studies for the development of atovaquone/proguanil, artesunate/amodiaquine, artesunate/pyronaridine and parenteral artesunate for malaria therapy and prophylaxis. 
Kremsner and his team developed a simplified method for assessment of severity of malaria. Outcome can now be predicted and therapy focused by health care providers using the "Lambaréné Score", which uses two clinical characteristics, coma and deep breathing without laboratory assessment. This was accomplished by using data from a study in 26,000 children with severe malaria in Africa led by him. 	
Kremsner took part in the phase 3 testing of the malaria vaccine, RTS,S/AS01, as a member of the governing clinical trial partnership committee and coordinator of clinical trials in Lambaréné. Since 2011, he and his team are working on development of other malaria vaccines, notably PfSPZ-based vaccines in cooperation with Sanaria Inc. Together with colleagues, he established a Plasmodium falciparum controlled human malaria infection (CHMI) model in Tübingen und Lambaréné. The Use of CHMI models dramatically reduces the time needed for clinical development of malaria vaccine and drug candidates. A study carried out in Tübingen evaluating a PfSPZ vaccine applying a CHMI model showed 100 percent protection against the homologous malaria strain.

Kremsner led the phase 2b/3 vaccine trial of CureVac's Covid-19 vaccine candidate CVnCoV, which was withdrawn in October 2021.

Personal life
Kremsner is married to the lawyer Inge Thomforde. They have three children (Helene, Gottfried and Ferdinand). He is interested in classical music, arts and literature.
In addition to his citizenship of the European Union (Austrian), Kremsner is also a Gabonese citizen.

Awards
 Knight of the National Order of Merit of Gabon, 2018
Honorary Professor of the Institute of Clinical Medical and Pharmaceutical Sciences, Hanoi, Vietnam, 2018
International Honorary Fellow of American Society of Tropical Medicine and Hygiene, 2017
Memento Research Prize for neglected diseases, 2017
Charles C. Shepard Science Award, 2015
Grand Prix of the Gabonese National Centre for Scientific and Technological Research (CENAREST), 2010
Fellow of the Royal College of Physicians, London, 2003
Karl Hermann Spitzy Prize for Chemotherapy, 1990

Selected publications

References

External links 
 Curriculum vitae
 Peter G. Kremsner´s website at Google Scholar

Living people
1961 births
German tropical physicians
20th-century Austrian physicians
Academic staff of the University of Tübingen